The Panasonic Lumix DMC-FZ60 or Panasonic Lumix DMC-FZ62 is a DSLR-like ultrazoom bridge camera announced by Panasonic back in 2012. FZ60 is for Americas and Asia-Pacific, while the FZ62 is for Europe and CIS. The highest-resolution pictures it records is 16.1 megapixels, through its 25mm Leica DC VARIO-ELMARIT.

Its successor is the FZ70/72 with a 16 megapixel sensor and 60x optical zoom lens.

Properties
24x optical zoom
16.1 megapixels sensor MOS
Light Speed AF
Full HD movie 1.920 x 1.080
Creative Control & Creative Retouch with 14 effects

References

External links

DMC-FZ62 on panasonic.it
Panasonic Lumix DMC-FZ62 review

Bridge digital cameras
FZ62